The 5th cabinet of executive ministers of Turkey (14 August 1923- 27 October 1923 ) was the fifth government formed by the nationalists after the Turkish War of Independence. The Republic was not yet proclaimed and the government was called  ("cabinet of executive ministers")

Background 
The chairman of the cabinet (equivalent to prime minister) was Fethi Bey (later named Okyar). Both Fethi Bey and the other members of the cabinet were elected by the parliament one by one. This cabinet was basically the same as the previous cabinet (4th cabinet of the Executive Ministers in Turkey) except for the fact that the previous chairman Rauf (Orbay) who was displeased with the treaty of Lausanne  had resigned and also a new ministry, that of Settlement and Population Exchange which was authorized for the exchange of Turkish and Greek population was included in the cabinet list.

The government
In the list below, the name in parathesis is the surname the cabinet members assumed later.(see Surname Law of 1934)

This cabinet was the last cabinet of the pre-Republic Turkey. Turkish Republic was proclaimed on 29 October 1923.

References

1923 establishments in Turkey
1923 disestablishments in Turkey
Politics of Turkey
Pre-Republic Turkey